Johannes Frederik Fröhlich (21 August 1806 – 21 May 1860) (or Frølich), a Danish violinist, conductor and composer, was a precursor of Niels Gade and J.P.E. Hartmann, and a central figure in Danish musical circles during the Romantic era.

Biography
He was a pupil of violinists Claus Schall and Friedrich Kuhlau. From 1827 he worked at the Royal Theatre, Copenhagen, where he was chief conductor from 1836. Fröhlich was a co-founder of the Music Society of Copenhagen and its first chairman.

Works
He wrote a symphony (in E-flat, Op. 33), and choral works and chamber music, as well as violin and piano compositions and a violin concerto. He wrote ballet music for the ballet-master and choreographer August Bournonville, founder of the Danish ballet tradition.

The main cache of his musical manuscripts is conserved in the Kongelige Bibliotek, Copenhagen.

Notable works
op. 1 Strygekvartet nr. 1 i d-mol (1825)
op. 2 Strygekvartet nr. 2 i A-dur
op. 3 violinkoncerter (1825)
Ouverture til Kong Salomon og Jørgen Hattemager (1825)
op. 4 Koncertino for Violin (1826)
op. 6 Introduktion og Polonaise for Violin med Orkester
op. 7 violinkoncert
op. 14 violinkoncert
op. 15 Strygekvartet (1827)
op. 17 Strygekvartet (muligvis 3 kvartetter 1827)
op. 19 Kvartet for 4 Horn (1827)
op. 20 Koncertino for Violin og 4 horn (1827)
Ouverture til Freias Alter (1828)
op. 24 Introduktion og Rondo for Horn med Orkester (1829)
Sonate i a-mol for Piano og Fløjte
op. 30 Violinkoncert (1829)
op. 30 Symfoni (1830)
op. 33 Symfoni i Eb-dur
Natten før Brylluppet (syngespil 1829)
op. 39 koncertouverture for Orkester
op. 40 Marche og Jagtstykke for 9 Horn (1832)
Nina (ballet)
Tyrolerne (ballet)
Valdemar (ballet 1835)
Festen i Albano (ballet 1839)
Fædrelandets muser (ballet 1840)
op. 51 Erik Menveds Barndom (ballet - med Riberhusmarch - 1843)
Rafael (ballet 1845)
Hertas Offer (ballet)
Abekatten (vaudeville af Johanne Louise Heiberg)
Majgildet (ouverture)
Maurerbrüder hemmet nicht die Zähre
Kantate til Christian 8.s kroningsfest
En Søndag på Amager

See also
List of Danish composers

References
Edition S: J. Fröhlich
Det Kongelige Bibliotek
This article was initially translated from the Danish Wikipedia.

External links

Male composers
1806 births
1860 deaths
19th-century Danish composers
19th-century male musicians